Three Royal Navy warships have been named HMS Sheffield after the city and county borough of Sheffield, South Yorkshire.
  (1936) – a  light cruiser which saw service in World War II from the Arctic Circle and the Atlantic to the Mediterranean. She was one of the Royal Navy pursuit ships that tracked down the German battleship Bismarck. She was sold and scrapped in 1967.
  (1971) – a Type 42 destroyer badly damaged by the Argentinian air forces on 4 May 1982 during the Falklands War. While being towed towards South Georgia Island, she sank in heavy seas.
  (1986) – a Type 22 frigate sold to the Chilean Navy in 2003 and renamed Almirante Williams.
  will be a Type 26 frigate.

All three of these warships have carried many fixtures and fittings manufactured in Sheffield itself, including a great number of stainless steel items, leading to the nickname that has been applied to all of them: the "Shiny Sheff".

Battle honours
 Norway 1940
 Spartivento 1940
 Atlantic 1941–43
 Bismarck 1941
 Mediterranean 1941
 Malta Convoys 1941
 Arctic 1941–43
 North Africa 1942
 Barents Sea 1942
 Biscay 1943
 Salerno 1943
 North Cape 1943
 Falkland Islands 1982

References

Royal Navy ship names
Sheffield